Algeria, Unspoken Stories is a 2007 documentary film. The film showed at the 2007 Toronto International Film Festival.

Synopsis 
When independence is declared in 1962, the minority communities of Jewish and European origin flee Algeria. Four people of Muslim ascendency searching for the truth about their own lives evoke the last decades of French colonization, the years of war, from 1955 to 1962. Hatred and friendship lead us through a hidden memory: their relationships with their Jewish and Christian neighbours. The foundational myths of the new Algeria are revisited, but will they succeed in getting to the bottom of their own legends?

References

External links 
 
 

2007 films
Creative Commons-licensed documentary films
Algerian documentary films
French documentary films
2007 documentary films
Jews and Judaism in Algeria
Documentary films about Jews and Judaism
Historiography of Algeria
Documentary films about African politics
2000s French films